Tianjin Tiechang Subdistrict is a subdistrict administered by Hedong District, Tianjin, but is actually situated within Handan, Hebei. In the year 2010, its population was 29,769.

The subdistrict was created in 1988. It was named after Tianjin Steel Mill, a factory that was first established in 1969.

Administrative divisions 
At of 2021, Tianjin Tiechang Subdistrict oversaw 6 communities. They are listed in the table below:

References 

Township-level divisions of Tianjin
Hedong District, Tianjin